Platoon is a real-time strategy video game developed by Digital Reality and published by Monte Cristo for the PC Windows in 2002. It was also published by Strategy First as Platoon: The 1st Airborne Cavalry Division in Vietnam. Platoon is the second video game adaptation of the 1986 war film of the same title, following the 1987 game by Ocean Software. Despite it  being marketed as "the first strategy game about the Vietnam War", the first such game was actually SSI's 1986 Nam.

Plot

The game begins with a newly promoted U.S. Army sergeant who has been ordered to lead an infantry squad in the Vietnam War.

Platoon is a mission-based tactical combat game taking place in the Vietnam Conflict. Terrain, vehicles and soldiers are all modeled and authentic, right down to the pockets on the uniforms and the types of plants and grass. The terrain affects your line of sight, and the surface and weather impose limits of the characters. The missions themselves are based on real missions undertaken during the Vietnam war. You groups contain up to 30 men, including engineers and commanders.

Reception

The game received "generally unfavorable reviews" according to the review aggregation website Metacritic. IGN's Dan Adams said: "If you're looking for something akin to this, you could try out Soldiers of Anarchy, which is great except for the pathfinding (which you can pray they fix) or even go back to the good old days and pick up one of the Myth series or even Commandos 2. But don't waste you're money here".

References

https://www.mobygames.com/game/8376/platoon/

External links

2002 video games
Real-time strategy video games
Video games developed in Hungary
Vietnam War video games
Video games set in Vietnam
Video games based on films
Windows games
Windows-only games
Strategy First games
MGM Interactive games
Digital Reality games